Battle of Roses is a 1950 Japanese drama film directed by Mikio Naruse. It is based on a novel by Fumio Niwa.

Cast
Kuniko Miyake
Setsuko Wakayama
Yōko Katsuragi
Kōji Tsuruta
Tōru Abe
Mitsuo Nagata
Yōko Wakasugi
Shirō Ōsaka
Noriko Sengoku
Hanshiro Iwai
Eitarō Shindō
Toshiko Ayukawa
Haruo Inoue
Shigeo Shizuyama
Hiroshi Aoyama

References

External links

1950 films
1950 drama films
Japanese drama films
Japanese black-and-white films
Films based on Japanese novels
Films directed by Mikio Naruse
1950s Japanese-language films
1950s Japanese films